Beluvalada Madilalli is a 1975 Indian Kannada-language film, directed by Geethapriya and produced by Smt Vanajakshi Devaraj. The film stars Rajesh, Kalpana, Balakrishna and Venkatarao Thalageri. The film has musical score by Rajan–Nagendra.

Cast

Rajesh as Maada
Kalpana as Girija
Balakrishna
Venkatarao Thalageri
Shakti Prasad
Master Nataraj
B. S. Jayakumar
Chandrashekar
Devaraj
V. Gopinath
Pandu
Sharath
Rajashekar
B. Jayashree
Girija
Indrani
Baby Vani
Jyothilatha
Madhuri
Hemavathi
Lakshmi
Kamal D. Kallimani
Vijaykumar
Hanumesh
Master Yogish
Master Srinivas
Shanthala
Baby Savitha

Soundtrack
The music was composed by Rajan–Nagendra.

References

External links
 
 

1975 films
1970s Kannada-language films
Films scored by Rajan–Nagendra
Films directed by Geethapriya